Melson House, also known as the Brown Residence and Curtis Jacobs House, is a historic home located near Atlanta, Sussex County, Delaware.  It was built in the 18th century, and is a two-story, three bay, brick dwelling.  It has a gable roof and two one-story wings, one brick and the other frame. It features a frame porch across most of the first-floor front and gable end chimneys.

It was added to the National Register of Historic Places in 1978.

References

Houses on the National Register of Historic Places in Delaware
Houses in Sussex County, Delaware
National Register of Historic Places in Sussex County, Delaware